Miho Mazereeuw is an Associate Professor of Architecture and Urbanism in the Department of Architecture at MIT where she also directs the Urban Risk Lab. Mazereeuw is most known for her work in disaster risk reduction.

Early life and education 
Mazereeuw, who is part Dutch and part Japanese, grew up in Malaysia, South Korea, and Singapore. She received a Bachelor of Arts in Sculpture and Environmental Science from Wesleyan University. While in college in 1995, she visited Kobe, Japan where her parents had recently moved after the Great Hanshin Earthquake. She then earned her Master in Architecture and Landscape Architecture from the Harvard Graduate School of Design (GSD). For her thesis, Mazereeuw designed an emergency infrastructure system as part of a subway station design, akin to the Urban Risk Lab's PrepHub project. Much of her research interest centers on coastal areas in the Pacific Rim of Fire.

Work 
Mazereeuw's experience in design practice include working in the offices of Shigeru Ban and Dan Kiley as well as an associate position at the Office for Metropolitan Architecture. Before joining MIT, she taught at Harvard's GSD and the University of Toronto. As the director of MIT's Urban Risk Lab, she leads multiple regional, national and international scale projects focusing on questions of resilience, design, and technology to improve disaster preparedness. 

The Urban Risk Lab's interdisciplinary work incorporates local communities, nonprofits, governments, educational institutions, and international corporations to develop "methods, prototypes and technologies to embed risk reduction and preparedness into the design of cities and regions to increase the resilience of local communities." Previous collaborations includes those with FEMA, USAID, Broward County, Florida, Tata Center, Line, Neighborhood Empowerment Network, Singapore University of Technology and Design, and the Resichauer Institute of Japanese Studies at Harvard University. In 2016, the Urban Risk Lab was profiled in Fast Company for their partnership with San Francisco to create PrepHub, a pilot urban resilience infrastructure project.

Projects 

 Resilient San Francisco 2080
 PrepHub
 Housing Pre-Planning Toolkit
 Urban Risk Map

Awards 

 Janet Darling Webel Prize, Harvard GSD
 Charles Eliot Traveling Fellowship in Landscape Architecture,  Harvard GSD
 2017 - LafargeHolcim Awards Acknowledgement Prize: Water Collective: Multifunctional Public Space in Thecho, Nepal
 Arthur W. Wheelwright Traveling Fellowship in Architecture

References

External links
 Urban Risk Lab
 PrepHub project
 Neighborhood Empowerment Network
 Resichauer Institute of Japanese Studies at Harvard University

Living people
MIT School of Architecture and Planning faculty
Architects from Connecticut
Wesleyan University alumni
Harvard Graduate School of Design alumni
Year of birth missing (living people)